George A. Elias is a Filipino politician who served as the Vice Mayor of Taguig, Philippines from 2004 until 2013. He is also the former President of Taguig City University.

Profile
In 2001–2004, he was Consultant of Legal & Legislative Affairs. In 1995–2001, he was Municipal Councilor of Taguig and Secretary of Municipal Council of Taguig.  He has Bachelor of Science in Industrial Engineering from Mapua Institute of Technology and Bachelor of Law from Jose Rizal University.

References

People from Taguig
Living people
1959 births
Lakas–CMD (1991) politicians
Kilusang Diwa ng Taguig politicians
Liberal Party (Philippines) politicians
Filipino engineers
Metro Manila city and municipal councilors
Mapúa University alumni
José Rizal University alumni